Any service that operates or is provided at night is a night service. It may also refer to:

 Night service (public transport), a public transport service that runs at night
 Night service (telephony), a feature of a telephone system for business
 Isha prayer, the night-time daily prayer recited by practising Muslims
 Vigil, a period of purposeful sleeplessness, an occasion for devotional watching, or an observance